James Mathison (born 14 January 1978) is an Australian television presenter and former independent political candidate.

Early life 

Mathison was born in Sydney, New South Wales and grew up in Northern Beaches suburb of Frenchs Forest. He attended St. Augustine's College, in Brookvale. After leaving school, he worked in various jobs, including working in a warehouse for a mail-order company and as a cashier at a service station, before spending a year on exchange in South America.

Career

Entertainment

Television
In 2001, Mathison was a contestant on the Channel Ten reality TV show The $20 Challenge, during which he was shown busking on the streets of London for extra money. He achieved second place in the contest. Weeks after returning from London, he auditioned for pay-TV channel Channel [V]'s new reporter search. After making it through to the final 8, he was offered a job there as video journalist.

In 2003, Mathison was appointed co-host of Australian Idol alongside Channel [V] host Andrew Günsberg. They created a behind-the-scenes show for Channel [V] called Australian Idol Extra for the second and third seasons of the programme. On 31 March 2009, after six years with Australian Idol, it was announced Mathison had quit as co-host.

Mathison appeared on a celebrity episode of the Australian version of Ready Steady Cook in October 2005, in which he was declared the winner, beating vegan Osher Günsberg (aka. Andrew G).

Mathison has also been a presenter on Nova 96.9 where he hosted "LaunchPad", a late night new music show with Patience Hodgkins of Brisbane band The Grates, as well as co hosting summer breakfast.

In 2005 and 2006, James hosted the ARIA Music Awards. In 2007, James, along with Hamish and Andy, hosted the ARIA Red Carpet segment. He also made a brief cameo appearance on the Australian feature film BoyTown in the ARIA's scene playing himself alongside Ella Hooper. In June 2009, Network Ten announced that James would be a reporter and panelist on The 7pm Project covering media and sport alongside, Charlie Pickering, Carrie Bickmore and Dave Hughes.  In July 2012, Mathison joined Weekend Sunrise where he replaced Jonathan Coleman as a movie reviewer.

In July 2013, Network Ten announced  Mathison would be presenter of its new breakfast program Wake Up alongside Natarsha Belling, Natasha Exelby and Nuala Hafner until the show was cancelled in May 2014.

In 2015, Mathison was a contestant in the fourth season of The Celebrity Apprentice Australia.

He appears occasionally 
on both  The Project and Studio 10 on Network Ten.

Music
Mathison also played in the Sydney-based band called The Punisherz between 2006 and 2008. They managed to play at both The Big Day Out and the Falls Festival.

In June and July 2008, Mathison played Adam, the partner of Eve, in the Chester Mystery Plays in the United Kingdom.

Politics
On 28 May 2016, Mathison announced that he would contest the 2016 federal election as an independent candidate for the federal seat of Warringah. The seat was held by Tony Abbott, a member of the Liberal Party and a former Prime Minister. Mathison received 11.4% of the primary vote. He assisted in grassroots training and campaign events supporting Zali Steggall in her successful bid to win the federal seat of Warringah as an independent in 2019.

References

External links

 WHO.com Australian Idol blog

1978 births
Australian Idol
Australian television presenters
Australian music critics
Australian music journalists
Australian VJs (media personalities)
People from Sydney
The Apprentice Australia candidates
Living people